George Kilham (1916 - 1978) was an Australian rugby league footballer who played in the 1930s and 1940s.

Playing career
Kilham made his debut for South Sydney in 1935 and during the same year played for Souths in the 1935 grand final defeat by arch rivals Eastern Suburbs.  

In 1938, Kilham was selected to play for New South Wales and also played for New South Wales City.  In 1939, Kilham was on the losing side again as Souths were defeated 33-4 by Balmain in the grand final played at the Sydney Cricket Ground.  

In 1944, Kilham joined Canterbury and played in 4 seasons at the club.  He captained the team in 1945 and in his final season missed out playing in the grand final against Balmain which Canterbury lost 13-9.

References

1916 births
1978 deaths
Australian rugby league players
Canterbury-Bankstown Bulldogs players
City New South Wales rugby league team players
New South Wales rugby league team
Rugby league locks
Rugby league players from Sydney
South Sydney Rabbitohs players
South Sydney Rabbitohs captains